Lynne Rowe (born 2 July 1958) is a New Zealand swimmer. She competed in three events at the 1976 Summer Olympics.

References

External links
 

1958 births
Living people
New Zealand female swimmers
Olympic swimmers of New Zealand
Swimmers at the 1976 Summer Olympics
Swimmers from Christchurch